Tsihombe is a municipality and a district of Androy in Madagascar.

Geography
This district is crossed by the Route nationale 10 and the Manambovo river.

References 

Districts of Androy